The 2020 Sakhir 2nd Formula 2 round was a pair of motor races for Formula 2 cars that took place on 5-6 December 2020 at the Outer Circuit Layout of the Bahrain International Circuit in Sakhir, Bahrain as part of the FIA Formula 2 Championship. It was the final round of the 2020 FIA Formula 2 Championship and ran in support of the 2020 Sakhir Grand Prix.

Report
Yuki Tsunoda collected another pole ahead of feature race, outpacing Nikita Mazepin by 0.122 seconds. Qualifying session was ended preliminary after the contact between Mick Schumacher and Roy Nissany. Tsunoda lost the lead after the first turn but was able to restore his lead after the pit stop and won the race ahead of Guanyu Zhou and Mazepin. But Mazepin was penalised after two incidents where his defence was recognised as forcing of Tsunoda and  Felipe Drugovich, who became a last podium finisher instead of Mazepin.

With Callum Ilott not being able to outscore Mick Schumacher by 14 points, Schumacher won the 2020 Formula 2 Championship.

Classification

Qualifying

Feature race

Note：
 – Nikita Mazepin originally finished in third place, but his defence against Yuki Tsunoda and Felipe Drugovich was considered as pushing of the track limits, which resulted to two five-second (10 seconds total) extra time penalty, and finally he was classified ninth.

Sprint race

Final championship standings

Drivers' Championship standings

Teams' Championship standings

 Note: Only the top five positions are included for both sets of standings.
 Note: Bold names include the Drivers' and Teams' Champion respectively.

See also 
2020 Sakhir Grand Prix

References

External links 
 

Sakhir Formula 2, 2nd
Sakhir Formula 2, 2nd